The word Yapeyú comes from the Guaraní language and means "ripe fruit".

 Yapeyú, Corrientes
Yapeyú River now called Guaviraví River

Guaraní words and phrases